Trigoniophthalmus is a genus of jumping bristletails in the family Machilidae. There are about 11 described species in Trigoniophthalmus.

Species
These 11 species belong to the genus Trigoniophthalmus:
 Trigoniophthalmus alternatus (Silvestri, 1904) i c g b
 Trigoniophthalmus banaticus Verhoeff, 1910 g
 Trigoniophthalmus borgesi Mendes, Gaju, Bach & Molero, 2000 g
 Trigoniophthalmus csikii (Stach, 1922) g
 Trigoniophthalmus equinus Wygodzinsky, 1958 g
 Trigoniophthalmus graecanicus Wygodzinsky, 1958 g
 Trigoniophthalmus hussoni Wygodzinsky, 1958 g
 Trigoniophthalmus imitator Wygodzinsky, 1958 g
 Trigoniophthalmus mimus Wygodzinsky, 1958 g
 Trigoniophthalmus remyi Wygodzinsky, 1958 g
 Trigoniophthalmus wygodzinskyi Stach, 1958 g
Data sources: i = ITIS, c = Catalogue of Life, g = GBIF, b = Bugguide.net

References

Further reading

External links

 

Archaeognatha